The karate competitions at the 2019 Southeast Asian Games in Philippines were held at World Trade Center Metro Manila from 7 to 9 December 2019.

Schedule
The following is the schedule for the karate competitions. All times are Philippine Standard Time (UTC+8).

Medal table

Medalists

Kata

Kumite

Men

Women

References

External links
  
 Results (Archived version)

2019 Southeast Asian Games events
2019
2019 in karate